James O'Shaughnessy (born January 14, 1992) is an American football tight end who is a free agent. He was drafted by the Kansas City Chiefs in the fifth round of the 2015 NFL Draft with the 173rd overall pick. He played college football at Illinois State from 2010-2014.

Professional career

Kansas City Chiefs 
O'Shaughnessy was drafted by the Kansas City Chiefs in the fifth round, 173rd overall, in the 2015 NFL Draft. During O'Shaughnessy's two years in Kansas City, he recorded eight receptions for 86 yards.

New England Patriots 
On April 29, 2017, the Chiefs traded O'Shaughnessy and a sixth-round selection in the 2017 NFL Draft to the New England Patriots for a fifth-round selection. He was released by the Patriots on September 2, 2017.

Jacksonville Jaguars
On September 3, 2017, O'Shaughnessy was claimed off waivers by the Jacksonville Jaguars.

On September 10, 2017, in his Jaguars debut, O'Shaughnessy had one reception for 18 yards in a 29–7 victory over the Houston Texans. In Week 16 against the San Francisco 49ers, he had five receptions for 39 receiving yards and a receiving touchdown. He finished with 14 receptions for 149 receiving yards and one receiving touchdown.

In the 2018 season, O'Shaughnessy finished with 24 receptions for 214 receiving yards.

On March 21, 2019, O'Shaughnessy re-signed with the Jaguars. In Week 5, against the Carolina Panthers, O’Shaughnessy suffered a torn ACL and was ruled out for the rest of the season. He finished with 14 receptions for 153 receiving yards and two receiving touchdowns. He was placed on the active/physically unable to perform list by the Jaguars at the start of training camp on August 1, 2020. He was moved back to the active roster on August 12.

O'Shaughnessy re-signed with the Jaguars on March 17, 2021. He was placed on injured reserve on September 22, 2021 after suffering an ankle injury in Week 2. He was activated on November 27.

Chicago Bears
On April 18, 2022, O'Shaughnessy signed with the Chicago Bears. He was released on August 30, 2022.

Minnesota Vikings
On November 14, 2022, O'Shaughnessy was signed to the Minnesota Vikings practice squad.

NFL career statistics

Regular season

Postseason

References

External links
Jacksonville Jaguars bio
Kansas City Chiefs bio
Illinois State Redbirds bio

1992 births
Living people
Sportspeople from Naperville, Illinois
Players of American football from Illinois
American football tight ends
Illinois State Redbirds football players
Kansas City Chiefs players
New England Patriots players
Jacksonville Jaguars players
Chicago Bears players
Minnesota Vikings players
Ed Block Courage Award recipients